The 1989 World Table Tennis Championships men's doubles was the 40th edition of the men's doubles championship.

Jörg Rosskopf and Steffen Fetzner won the title after defeating Leszek Kucharski and Zoran Kalinić in the final by two sets to one.

Results

See also
List of World Table Tennis Championships medalists

References

-